Singapore  women's junior national softball team is the junior national under-17 team for Singapore. The team competed at the 2013 ISF Junior Women's World Championship in Brampton, Ontario where they finished fourteenth.

References

External links 
 International Softball Federation

Softball
Women's national under-18 softball teams
Softball in Singapore
Youth sport in Singapore